Charlottsville is an unincorporated community and census-designated place (CDP) in Blair County, Pennsylvania, United States. It was first listed as a CDP prior to the 2020 census.

The CDP is in northern Blair County, mostly in the eastern part of Antis Township but extending northeastward into the southern part of Snyder Township. North Pleasant Valley Boulevard (old U.S. Route 220) forms the southeastern edge of the CDP, and the Pittsburgh Line of the Norfolk Southern Railway forms the northwestern edge. Interstate 99 passes southeast of the community, with access from Exit 45 at Pleasant Valley Boulevard.

Charlottsville is on the northwestern side of the valley of the Little Juniata River, which flows east to join the Juniata River near Petersburg.

Demographics

References 

Census-designated places in Blair County, Pennsylvania
Census-designated places in Pennsylvania